Frederick Nash Ogden (January 25, 1837 – May 25, 1886) was a Confederate officer and leading white supremacist organizer of New Orleans, Louisiana. He was a major in the 8th Louisiana Heavy Artillery Battalion during the Siege of Vicksburg. He then led the 9th Louisiana Cavalry Regiment, a mounted infantry unit known as Ogden's Cavalry. After the war he became a leading White Leaguer and was involved in the Battle of Liberty Place.

He became known as General Fred Ogden and the Louisiana State Museum obtained a dress sword he was presented. It also obtained a few of his papers.

He served as president of the Crescent City White League shortly after its founding.

A bronze relief was made of him by George T. Brewster in 1921 for his role at Vicksburg. His funeral was a major event attended by political leaders. A road in New Orleans was named for him.

References

People of the Reconstruction Era
1837 births
1886 deaths
Confederate States Army officers
Neo-Confederates